Spirulina magnifica  is a cyanobacteria from the genus Spirulina which occur in freshwater.

References

Further reading 
 

 

Spirulinales
Bacteria described in 2001